Terrance Lynn Unrein (born October 24, 1962) is a former American football nose tackle and current Chief Commercial Officer - Americas for SEKO Worldwide Logistics. He played college football at Colorado State. He was drafted in the third round (66th overall) of the 1986 NFL draft by the San Diego Chargers.

Early years
Unrein was born October 24, 1962 in Brighton, Colorado. He graduated from Colorado State with a B.B.A. in Business/Managerial Economics.

In 1985, he was named First-team All-Conference. He also competed in the 48th Blue–Gray Football Classic for the North team.

Professional career
Unrein was selected in the third round (66th overall) of the 1986 NFL draft by the San Diego Chargers. He spent two seasons with the Chargers. While there, he appeared in 21 games with nine starts, seven as a rookie and two the following year. He also recorded three career sacks. In August 1988 he was waived by the Chargers.

In 1989, Unrein was in training camp with the San Francisco 49ers.

Post-football career
Unrein spent 11 years working for Eagle Global Logistics (EGL) and CEVA Logistics in sales. He then spent two and a half years at SEKO. He was the hired as the VP of Global Sales for Crane Worldwide Logistics, a full-service air, ocean, trucking, customs brokerage and logistics company.

Personal life
He is a distant cousin of Tampa Bay Buccaneers defensive end Mitch Unrein.

References

External links
  

1962 births
Living people
Players of American football from Colorado
People from Brighton, Colorado
American football defensive linemen
Colorado State Rams football players
San Diego Chargers players
San Francisco 49ers players